Scott Township is one of sixteen townships in Franklin County, Iowa, United States.  As of the 2010 census, its population was 382 and it contained 178 housing units.

History
Scott Township was created in 1878.

Geography

Cities, towns, villages
 Alexander
 Coulter (west quarter)

Cemeteries
The township contains Alexander Cemetery.

Transportation
 Interstate 35
 Iowa Highway 107
 Iowa Highway 3

School districts
 Belmond-Klemme Community School District
 Cal Community School District
 Dows Community School District

Political districts
 Iowa's 4th congressional district
 State House District 54
 State Senate District 27

References

External links
 City-Data.com

Townships in Iowa
Townships in Franklin County, Iowa
1878 establishments in Iowa